Barasso (Varesino dialect Baràs) is a town and comune located in the province of Varese in the Lombardy region of northern Italy.
Barasso has a population of 1657 people (based on December 2020 data). In the fourth century, Emperor Theodosius I commissioned S.Giulio to build a church there.

References

External links

 http://www.comune.barasso.va.it
 Oltrona al Lago

Cities and towns in Lombardy